Ruseni or Ruşeni may refer to the following places:

Romania
 Ruseni, a village in Borlești Commune, Neamţ County
 Ruseni, a village in Poiana Teiului Commune, Neamţ County
 Ruşeni, a village in Păulești, Satu Mare Commune, Satu Mare County
 Rusenii Noi and Rusenii Vechi, villages in Holboca Commune, Iaşi County

Moldova
 Ruseni, a village administered by Anenii Noi city, Anenii Noi District
 Ruseni, Edineţ, a commune in Edineţ District

See also 
Rus (surname)
Rusu (disambiguation)
Rusca (disambiguation)
Rusești (disambiguation)
Rusciori (disambiguation)